The Mahinerangi Wind Farm is a wind farm on the north side of Lake Mahinerangi, around 50 km west of Dunedin, in Otago, New Zealand. Stage one of the wind farm, generating 36 MW, was commissioned in March 2011, and an additional 160 MW is consented to be commissioned in further stages.

The wind farm is owned and operated by Mercury NZ Ltd. It was the second major wind farm to be built in the South Island.

History
Resource consent was granted in 2007 and later confirmed after an appeal to the Environment Court.

Construction of stage 1 of the wind farm, consisting of twelve turbines, began in September 2010. Vestas V90-3MW turbines were chosen for the wind farm, having previously been used for stage 3 of Tararua Wind Farm in 2007. Turbines were shipped to Port Chalmers, and trucked through Dunedin to their final site.

The wind farm generated its first electricity on 21 February 2011, with the first two turbines being commissioned. All twelve stage one turbines were completed and generating electricity by the end of March 2011.

Location
The wind farm will be contained within  of land at an elevation of 600 to 730 metres above sea level and about 50 kilometres west of Dunedin.  Most of the land in the proposed site is pasture grazed by sheep and cattle.

Stage 2
Stage 2 at Mahinerangi is proposed for up to 100 wind turbines producing 160MW and an annual output of over 600GWh. Resource consents were granted in 2009.

Transmission
Electricity generated from Stage 1 turbines is injected into the nearby Deep Stream and Waipori hydro schemes. This utilised the existing 33kV transmission line and avoided the cost of additional transmission infrastructure. Electricity from Stage 1 and the hydro schemes is then injected into either Dunedin's local distribution network, or into Transpower's Halfway Bush-Balclutha-Gore 110 kV line at Berwick.

Stage 2 and beyond is too large to inject into the Waipori/Deep Stream system. Instead, it will inject into Transpower's Halfway Bush-Roxburgh 110 kV line, which passes a short distance south of the wind farm.

See also

Wind power in New Zealand
Project Hayes

References

External links
 
 
 Upland Landscape Protection Society

Wind farms in New Zealand
Buildings and structures in Otago